Metriorhynchinae is a subfamily of metriorhynchid crocodyliforms from the late Middle Jurassic to the Early Cretaceous (Callovian - Valanginian) of Europe, North America and South America. Named by Fitzinger, in 1843, it contains the metriorhynchids Maledictosuchus, Gracilineustes, Metriorhynchus, Cricosaurus and Rhacheosaurus. The last three taxa form a tribe within Metriorhynchinae, the Rhacheosaurini. Metriorhynchinae is one of two subfamilies of Metriorhynchidae, the other being Geosaurinae.

Phylogeny 
Metriorhynchinae is a stem-based taxon defined in 2009 as the most inclusive clade consisting of Metriorhynchus geoffroyii, but not Geosaurus giganteus. Rhacheosaurini is a stem-based taxon and it was named and defined by Mark T. Young, Mark A. Bell and Stephen L. Brusatte in 2011 as the most inclusive clade including Rhacheosaurus gracilis, but not Metriorhynchus geoffroyii and Gracilineustes leedsi. The cladogram below follows the topology from the analyses by Young, et al. 2020.

References

Early Cretaceous crocodylomorphs
Middle Jurassic crocodylomorphs
Late Jurassic crocodylomorphs
Callovian first appearances
Early Cretaceous extinctions
Thalattosuchians